Iyhia McMichael is an African-American, former collegiate All-American, professional 3-time All-Star, left-handed hitting softball player, originally from Nacogdoches, Texas. She was a outfielder for the Mississippi State Bulldogs in the Southeastern Conference from 2001 to 2004, ranking in several school and conference records. She would go on to be named a 4-time all-conference honoree and back-to-back SEC Player of the Year in 2003–04. She also ranks top-15 all time in the NCAA Division I for her career triples. She was later drafted No. 1 overall in the National Pro Fastpitch and played for the defunct Akron Racers from 2004 to 2007, including being named the league's first Player of The Year and winning a title in 2005; McMichael ranks top-10 for career batting average for the league. McMichael has also coached at the college level.

Statistics

External links

References

Living people
Softball players from Texas
Mississippi State Bulldogs softball players
Akron Racers players
American softball coaches
Softball coaches from Texas
Year of birth missing (living people)